Suzy Bogguss is an American country music singer-songwriter. Her discography consists of 16 studio albums, two compilation albums, one live album, and two demo albums. Bogguss has released 38 singles, with six of those reaching the Top Ten of the US Billboard Hot Country Songs chart between 1992 and 1994. An additional six singles reached the Top 40 of the same chart between 1989 and 1998.

Bogguss' breakthrough album, Aces, was released in 1991. It reached the Top 20 of the Billboard Top Country Albums chart and featured four Top 15 singles on the country singles chart. The album was subsequently certified platinum by the Recording Industry Association of America, without having charted a number one single. Her next two releases, Voices in the Wind (1992) and Something Up My Sleeve (1993), were both certified gold by the Recording Industry Association of America. 

Although recording and releasing material throughout the 1990s and 2000s, Bogguss has failed to match the success of her earlier albums. In the late-1990s, only one single cracked the Top 40 of the country charts, and the subsequent singles failed to reach the Top 60, or even chart at all. Her latest release, Aces Redux, a re-recording of her 1991 album Aces, was released in August 2016.

Studio albums

1980s and 1990s

2000s and 2010s

Compilation albums

Demo albums

Live albums

Singles

Christmas singles

As a featured artist

Music videos

Guest appearances

References

Bogguss, Suzy
Discographies of American artists